Mariusz Przybylski (born January 19, 1982 in Częstochowa) is a Polish footballer who plays for Unia Rędziny.

External links 
 
 

1982 births
Living people
Polish footballers
Górnik Zabrze players
Polonia Bytom players
Raków Częstochowa players
RKS Radomsko players
Sportspeople from Częstochowa
Ekstraklasa players
I liga players
III liga players
IV liga players
Association football midfielders